Alessandra Sensini (born 26 January 1970 in Grosseto) is an Italian windsurfer. She is a 4-time Olympian, winning a gold medal and three additional medals. She also won 3 gold, 2 silver medals and 1 bronze at World Championships, as well as 3 gold, 2 silver and 2 bronze medals at European Championships.

She has sailed in three different windsurfing classes: Lechner A-390, Mistral and RS:X.

Biography
Alessandra Sensini was one of four candidates for the role of flagbearer for Italy at the 2012 London Olympics. The others were Federica Pellegrini, Josefa Idem, and Valentina Vezzali, who was finally chosen.

Achievements

See also
Italian sportswomen multiple medalists at Olympics and World Championships
Women multiple medallist at the Windsurfing World Championships

References

External links
 
 
 
 
 
 

ISAF World Sailor of the Year (female)
1970 births
Living people
Italian windsurfers
Olympic sailors of Italy
Italian female sailors (sport)
Olympic gold medalists for Italy
Olympic silver medalists for Italy
Olympic bronze medalists for Italy
Sailors at the 1992 Summer Olympics – Lechner A-390
Sailors at the 1996 Summer Olympics – Mistral One Design
Sailors at the 2000 Summer Olympics – Mistral One Design
Sailors at the 2004 Summer Olympics – Mistral One Design
Sailors at the 2008 Summer Olympics – RS:X
Sailors at the 2012 Summer Olympics – RS:X
People from Grosseto
Olympic medalists in sailing
Medalists at the 2008 Summer Olympics
Medalists at the 2004 Summer Olympics
Female windsurfers
Medalists at the 2000 Summer Olympics
Medalists at the 1996 Summer Olympics
RS:X class world champions
Sportspeople from the Province of Grosseto